Álvar Enciso Fernandez-Valderrama (born February 27, 1974 in Valladolid) is a Spanish rugby union player. He plays as a centre. His nickname was Fortukin. During his career, he was captain of CR El Salvador.

Career
His first international cap was during a match against Switzerland, at Lisbon, on May 11, 1993. He was part of the 1999 Rugby World Cup roster, playing two matches of the tournament. His last international cap was during a match against Georgia, at Tbilisi, on October 28, 2006. Between 1995 and 2001 he also played for Spain sevens.

Personal life
He is son of Pilar Fernández Valderrama, a former Spanish track and field athlete. He practised track and field during his childhood. He works as an architect and has four sons.

References

External links
 

1974 births
Living people
Sportspeople from Valladolid
Spanish rugby union players
Rugby union centres
Spain international rugby union players